The 1994 Shankill Road killings took place on 16 June 1994 when the Irish National Liberation Army (INLA) shot dead three Ulster Volunteer Force (UVF) members – high-ranking member of the UVF Belfast Brigade staff Trevor King and two other UVF members, Colin Craig and David Hamilton – on the Shankill Road in Belfast, close to the UVF headquarters. The following day, the UVF launched two retaliatory attacks. In the first, UVF members shot dead a Catholic civilian taxi driver in Carrickfergus. In the second, they shot dead two Protestant civilians in Newtownabbey, who they believed were Catholics. The Loughinisland massacre, two days later, is believed to have been a further retaliation.

Background 
The UVF had been considering calling a ceasefire soon, which they believed would be from a position of strength. 
The Irish National Liberation Army had been in decline since the late 1980s after the feud with Irish People's Liberation Organization in which the loss of their best operators in Belfast 1987 had left them weak and largely inactive. But in 1992 the INLA had somewhat of a resurgence in its campaign. On 14 April 1992, a British Army (BA) recruiting sergeant Michael Newman (33) was shot dead by two INLA volunteers outside an army recruiting office in Derby. It was a significant incident as Newman was the first serving member of British Armed Forces to be killed by the INLA since 1984 when they shot dead UDR soldier Colin Houston. It was also significant in that this was the first person the INLA had killed in England since the Airey Neave killing. Two months later, on 18 June 1992, they struck in England again with two firebombs in stores in Leeds causing £50,000 worth of damage. On 14 January 1993 an INLA hit team fired rifle shots through the window of the home of UVF leader John "Bunter" Graham at Belfast, seriously injuring him. In June 1993 they killed retired RUC officer, John Patrick Murphy.

Shootings 

A car drove past them and as it did so, INLA gunmen inside the vehicle opened fire on the three men. The car was later found burning close to Divis tower. David Lister and Hugh Jordan claimed that Gino Gallagher, who was himself shot dead in 1996 during an internal dispute, was the main gunman in the attack. However, Jack Holland and Henry McDonald said that Gallagher was inside the car which was scouting the area for UVF members, and not one of the gunmen. Colin Craig was killed on the spot. King and David Hamilton lay in the street, seriously wounded as panic and chaos erupted on the Shankill in the wake of the shooting. Presbyterian minister, the Reverend Roy Magee was in "The Eagle" discussing an upcoming Combined Loyalist Military Command (CLMC) meeting and the possibility of a loyalist ceasefire with the UVF Brigade Staff when the attack took place. He and the others raced out of the building after hearing the gunfire. He later described the scene he came upon outside.

"With some others, I ran down to where the men were. One was already dead and the others were in a very, very bad physical state. The road was in pandemonium at that stage. You could see that the leadership of the UVF was quite naturally very, very broken and disturbed about the shooting of their colleague. He [Trevor King] was a senior commander".

King was rushed to hospital where he was put on a life-support machine. The shooting had left him paralysed from the neck down. He died on 9 July with Reverend Magee at his bedside. According to Magee, King himself made the decision to turn off the machine.

The killings were a blow for the Northern Ireland peace process and a morale boost for the INLA. The attack was the INLA's deadliest action since the Droppin Well bombing in 1982 which killed seventeen people, 11 British soldiers and 6 civilians.

Aftermath 

The following day, the UVF launched two 'retaliatory' attacks. In the first, UVF members shot dead a Catholic civilian taxi driver in Carrickfergus. In the second, they shot dead two Protestant civilians in Newtownabbey, who they believed were Catholics. Two days after the killings the UVF decided to launch another  revenge attack when they killed six Catholic civilians in a bar while they were watching the Ireland vs Italy 1994 World Cup game opener in what became known as Loughinisland massacre. The tit-for-tat attacks continued on and off for the spring and summer of 1994 until the Provisional IRA ceasefire of 31 August 1994 and the CLMC ceasefire in October. The attacks on the Shankill were the INLA's deadliest attack of the 1990s.

When interviewed for Boston College for research on the conflict, Progressive Unionist Party leader David Ervine suggested the INLA might have been working in cahoots with the Provisional IRA in targeting prominent Loyalists, as the month after the Provisional IRA killed three leading UDA men, Ray Smallwoods on 11 July and Raymond Elder and Joe Bratty on 31 July.

See also
Timeline of Irish National Liberation Army actions

Sources
Jack Holland, Henry McDonald, INLA – Deadly Divisions
CAIN project

References

1994 in Northern Ireland
The Troubles in Belfast
Conflicts in 1994
Deaths by firearm in Northern Ireland
Irish National Liberation Army
Military actions and engagements during the Troubles (Northern Ireland)
June 1994 events in the United Kingdom
1994 crimes in the United Kingdom